Ypsolopha acerella is a moth of the family Ypsolophidae. It is known from the Russian Far East and Korea.

The length of the forewings is 7.8–8.3 mm.

The larvae feed on Acer ginnala.

Etymology
The specific name is derived from the generic name of the host plant, Acer.

References

Ypsolophidae
Moths of Asia